Adonideae is an accepted tribe of the subfamily Ranunculoideae. Adonideae contains two genera, Adonis (pheasant's eye) and Trollius (globeflowers).

References 

Ranunculaceae
Plant tribes